The term Grem may refer to:
 A main character in the movie Cars 2
 The city of Kutaisi in Georgia, former capital of Colchis and the Kingdom of Imereti
 SIMON breach grenade (Grenade Rifle Entry Munition)
 Grem, Uttar Pradesh, a village in India
 A Central Pennsylvanian term used to identify one's grandmother